Marielle is a French female name, a diminutive of Marie. Notable people with the name include:

Marielle Franco, Brazilian politician and human rights activist
Marielle Gallo (born 1949), French politician and Member of the European Parliament
Marielle Goitschel (born 1945), former French alpine skier
Marielle Houle, Canadian woman who helped her ailing son Charles Fariala commit suicide
Marielle Jaffe (born 1989), American model and actress
Katia and Marielle Labèque, French sisters forming a piano duo
Marielle de Sarnez (born 1951), French politician and Member of the European Parliament
Jean-Pierre Marielle (1932-2019), French actor

See also
Mariella (disambiguation)
Mariel (given name)

References 

French feminine given names